Contratto is an Italian alcoholic beverage company which produces sparkling wine, vermouth, and Contratto Americano Rosso.

Leonetto Cappiello created ads for Contratto.

References

Wineries of Italy
Vermouth
Italian companies established in 1867
Food and drink companies established in 1867